The Richmond Baronetcy, of Hollington in the County of Sussex, was a title in the Baronetage of the United Kingdom. It was created on 4 July 1929 for the businessman Frederick Henry Richmond. He was chairman of the department stores Debenhams and Harvey Nichols. The title became officially dormant (and de facto extinct) on the death of his son, the second Baronet, in 2000. For more information, follow this link.

Blazon of Richmond Baronets of Hollington (1929)

Sir Frederick Henry Richmond, 1st Baronet (1873–1953)
Sir John Frederick Richmond, 2nd Baronet (1924–2000)

References
Kidd, Charles, Williamson, David (editors). Debrett's Peerage and Baronetage (1990 edition). New York: St Martin's Press, 1990.

Baronetcies in the Baronetage of the United Kingdom
Dormant baronetcies